A wardrobe or armoire or almirah is a standing closet used for storing clothes. The earliest wardrobe was a chest, and it was not until some degree of luxury was attained in regal palaces and the castles of powerful nobles that separate accommodation was provided for the apparel of the great. The name of wardrobe was then given to a room in which the wall-space was filled with closets and lockers, the drawer being a comparatively modern invention. From these cupboards and lockers the modern wardrobe, with its hanging spaces, sliding shelves and drawers, evolved slowly.

Throughout the chronological changes in the form of the enclosure, it has more or less retained its preset function as a place to retain a king’s robe. The word has gained coinage over successive generations as an independent store for among others, preserving precious items for a ruler like gold, well highlighted in King Edward I of England's times. It is also a simple patio where clothes are hung from metal bars or tucked inside utility racks running from up to down. The modern wardrobe differs in one respect from the historical one for its triple partitioning: there are two linear compartments on either side with shelves as well as a middle space made up of hanging pegs and drawers, the latter being a latter-day addition, besides a clothes’ press in the higher central space on level with a person’s chest.

Additionally, an armoire is a wardrobe that is wider than a grown adult's arm span, while a wardrobe is smaller.

Etymology
The word wardrobe appeared in the English language in the early 14th century. It originated from Old French words warderobe, wardereube and garderobe, in which "warder" meant "to keep, to guard" and "robe" meant "garment".

History

In the United States, the wardrobe in its moveable form as an oak "hanging cupboard" dates back to the early 17th century. At that time it was an early export product from America to England, because English woodlands were over-harvested or reserved for the Navy. Consequently, the item was sometimes referred to as an oakley. For probably a hundred years, such pieces, massive and cumbrous in form, but often with well-carved fronts, were produced in moderate numbers; then the gradual diminution in the use of oak for cabinet-making produced a change of fashion in favor of the more plentiful American walnut. (The virgin American forests became successively Oak, then Maple with successive deforestation episodes.)

Walnut succeeded oak as the favourite material for furniture, but hanging wardrobes in walnut appear to have been made very rarely, although clothes presses, with drawers and sliding trays, were frequent.

During a large portion of the 18th century, the tallboy was much used for storing clothes.

Size

A common feature was to base future size on the eight small men method. A considered good size double wardrobe would thus be able to hold within its capacity, eight small men.

In the nineteenth century, the wardrobe began to develop into its modern form, with a hanging cupboard at each side, a press in the upper part of the central portion, and drawers below. As a rule, it was often of mahogany, but as satinwood and other previously scarce, fine-grained, foreign woods began to be obtainable in considerable quantities, many elaborately and even magnificently inlaid wardrobes were made.

Where Chippendale and his school had carved, Sheraton, Hepplewhite and their contemporaries achieved their effects by the artistic employment of deftly contrasted and highly polished woods.

The next to last step in the evolution of the wardrobe was taken when the central doors, which had previously enclosed merely the upper part, were carried to the floor, covering the drawers as well as the sliding shelves, and were often fitted with mirrors.

In the United Kingdom, a more affluent option is custom-fitted wardrobes, which are built around the size and shape of the room.

Kas style

Kas, kast, or kasten (pronounced kaz) is a massive cupboard or wardrobe of Dutch origin similar to an armoire that was popular in the Netherlands and America in the 17th & 18th centuries. It was fitted with shelves and drawers used to store linen, clothing, and other valuables and locked by key. They were status symbols and family heirlooms in the Low Countries and imported luxury goods to the American colonies. As such they were often made of quality wood such as cherry, rosewood and ebony that were paneled, carved or painted.

See also
 Cabinetry
 Closet
 Encoignure
 Shoe rack

References

External links

 American kasten: the Dutch-style cupboards of New York and New Jersey, 1650–1800, an exhibition catalog from The Metropolitan Museum of Art Libraries (fully available online as PDF), containing materials on wardrobes.

Furniture
Clothing containers
Cabinets (furniture)